Kenney Glacier is a glacier  long flowing northwest from The Pyramid and The Saddlestone into Depot Glacier, near the head of Hope Bay, Trinity Peninsula, Antarctica. It was mapped in 1945 and 1948 by the Falkland Islands Dependencies Survey (FIDS), was resurveyed by the FIDS in 1955, and was named for Richard Kenney, assistant surveyor at Hope Bay in 1954 and 1955, who made a detailed local survey of the area between Hope Bay and Duse Bay.

See also
 List of glaciers in the Antarctic
 Glaciology

References

 

Glaciers of Trinity Peninsula